Tylototriton broadoridgus is a species of salamander in the family Salamandridae from the Tianping Mountains of Sangzhi County, Hunan, China.

References

Shen Y, Jiang J, Mo X 2012 A new species of the genus Tylototriton (Amphibia, Salamandridae) from Hunan, China. Asian Herpetological Research 3: 21–30.

broadoridgus